The Mayor of Quincy is the head of the municipal government in Quincy, Massachusetts.

List of mayors

References

Quincy